The 1947–48 Northern Football League season was the 50th in the history of the Northern Football League, a football competition in Northern England.

Clubs

The league featured 13 clubs which competed in the last season, along with one new club:
 East Tanfield Colliery Welfare

League table

References

1947-48
4